Henry Richard Trinder (born 14 April 1989) is an English rugby union player for Ampthill in the RFU Championship. He also plays for the Dallas Jackals in Major League Rugby (MLR) in the United  States. His regular position as at centre.

Professional career
Trinder's first appearance for Gloucester was a brief substitute appearance at Edgeley Park when he came on for Leon Lloyd towards the end of the 2007–08 season. The following season he started four times, covering for Mike Tindall when he was with England or injured.

In 2017/18, Trinder was awarded try of the week in Week 6 for his try against Northampton Saints and again in Week 14 for his try against Leicester Tigers.

Trinder was called up to the English national side for the uncapped annual fixture against the Barbarians in May 2014.

On 12 April 2021, after 13 years playing at Kingsholm, it was confirmed that Trinder would leave Gloucester to sign for Vannes in the Pro D2 competition in France as a medical joker for the rest of the 2020-21 season.

In August 2021 it was announced that he had signed for RFU Championship side Ampthill as a player-coach.

References

External links
 

1989 births
Living people
Ampthill RUFC players
English rugby union players
Gloucester Rugby players
Moseley Rugby Football Club players
Rugby union players from Swindon
Rugby Club Vannes players
Rugby union centres
Dallas Jackals players